The Quebec-One Missile Alert Facility, also known as Quebec-01 or Q-01, located 30 miles north of Cheyenne, Wyoming, near Chugwater, was a United States Air Force ICBM launch control facility.  It was operated by the 400th Missile Squadron constructed in 1962. The Missile Alert Facility operated with a Minuteman missile  until 1970 when it was converted to a Minuteman-III site.  Finally in 1986, the facility was converted to operate the Peacekeeper ICBM. The facility was deactivated in 2005 and turned over to Wyoming State Parks in December 2017. The facility was opened to the public in August 2019 as the Quebec 01 Missile Alert Facility State Historic Site after restoration work done by the United States Air Force.

See also
 List of museums in Wyoming
 Minuteman Missile National Historic Site
 Ronald Reagan Minuteman Missile State Historic Site
 Titan Missile Museum
 Strategic Air and Space Museum 
 Strategic missile forces museum in Ukraine

References

Cold War museums in the United States
Military and war museums in Wyoming
Museums in Laramie County, Wyoming
Wyoming state historic sites
1962 establishments in Wyoming
Protected areas established in 2019
2019 establishments in the United States